Midukkipponnamma is a 1978 Indian Malayalam film,  directed by A. B. Raj. The film stars Jayan, Jayabharathi and Paravoor Bharathan in the lead roles. The film has musical score by M. K. Arjunan.

Cast
Jayan
Jayabharathi
Paravoor Bharathan

References

External links
 

1978 films
1970s Malayalam-language films